Dutchman's pipe is a common name for some unrelated flowering plants, which have flowers, inflorescences or stems resembling a pipe:

 Aristolochia species (birthworts or pipevines) from the Aristolochiaceae, particularly Aristolochia macrophylla
 Epiphyllum oxypetalum ("night-blooming cereus") from the Cactaceae
 Monotropa hypopitys (also known as yellow bird's-nest or pinesap) from the Ericaceae